Lisa Boyer is the associate head coach of the South Carolina Gamecocks women's basketball team since 2010. Prior to her time with the Gamecocks, Boyer was the head coach of the Bradley Braves women's basketball team from 1986 to 1996. As an assistant for the Cleveland Cavaliers from 2001 to 2002, Boyer was the first woman to coach in the National Basketball Association. Boyer was inducted into the Ithaca College Athletics Hall of Fame in 2014.

Early life and education
Boyer was born in Ogdensburg, New York. She graduated from Ithaca College with a Bachelor of Science and the University of North Carolina at Greensboro with a master's degree.

Career
Boyer started her coaching career as an assistant coach for the Davidson Wildcats women's basketball team from 1981 to 1982. After head coaching the Converse Valkyries for a season, Boyer was briefly an assistant coach for the East Carolina Pirates, Miami RedHawks, and Virginia Tech Hokies until the mid 1980s. After leaving the Hokies in 1986, Boyer began a ten year position as the head coach of the Bradley Braves women's basketball team. She then moved on to the American Basketball League to head coach the Philadelphia Rage from 1996 to 1997.

After the ABL, Boyer went to the Women's National Basketball Association and was the assistant coach of the Cleveland Rockers from 1998 to 2002. During her time with the Rockers, she became the first woman to hold a coaching position in the National Basketball Association. In the NBA, she was an assistant for the Cleveland Cavaliers from 2001 to 2002.

Boyer returned to the National Collegiate Athletic Association in 2002 when she was named an assistant coach for the Temple Owls women's basketball team. She remained with the Owls until 2008 when she switched to the South Carolina Gamecocks and resumed her assistant coach position. Boyer was promoted to associate head coach of the Gamecocks in 2010.

Awards and honors
Boyer was inducted into the Ithaca College Athletics Hall of Fame in 2014.

See also 
 List of female NBA coaches

References

Year of birth missing (living people)
Davidson Wildcats women's basketball coaches
East Carolina Pirates women's basketball coaches
Miami RedHawks women's basketball coaches
Virginia Tech Hokies women's basketball coaches
Bradley Braves women's basketball coaches
Cleveland Rockers coaches
Cleveland Cavaliers personnel
Temple Owls women's basketball coaches
South Carolina Gamecocks women's basketball coaches
Living people
Ithaca College alumni